All 65 members of Westmorland and Furness Council unitary authority in England are elected every four years.

Political control
The first election to the council was held in 2022, initially as a "shadow authority", preparing for 1 April 2023 when the new council will come into effect and take over the functions of Cumbria County Council and the three district councils which will be abolished. Political control of the council has been held by the following parties:

Leadership
Political leadership will be provided by the leader of the council. The first leader of the shadow authority is Jonathan Brook, a Liberal Democrat, who is also the outgoing leader of South Lakeland District Council, one of the three districts to be abolished.

Council elections

References

External links
Westmorland and Furness Council

 
 
Council elections in Cumbria
Unitary authority elections in England